For the Russian minister of the Navy, see Stepan Arkadyevich Voyevodsky

Stepan Vasilievich Voyevodsky (born 1803 – died September 17, 1884) was an admiral of Imperial Russian Navy, Governor of Russian America in 1854–1859 and military governor of Astrakhan in 1860s.

Stepan Voyevodsky was born in Smolensk Governorate in the family of a retired Army officer. He joined the Naval Cadets Corps in 1818, and was commissioned as midshipman in March 1822. 

Voyevodsky served in the Baltic Fleet until 1834. In 1824 Voyevodsky sailed to Iceland, in 1825 to Mediterranean Sea. In 1827–1830 lieutenant Voyevodsky served on Jezekiel, a ship-of-the-line of count Login Geiden's Mediterranean squadron; he participated in the Battle of Navarino in October 1827 and in the naval blockade of the Dardanelles during the Russo-Turkish War of 1828–1829. 

After four peaceful seasons with the Baltic Fleet (1830–1834) Voyevodsky was transferred from the Navy to the Russian-American Company. He crossed Asia by land, reaching Okhotsk, and sailed to Novoarkhangelsk with Sitka. He commanded Sitka and Yelena until 1839 and was promoted to captain-lieutenant in 1837. In 1841 he sailed from the Pacific to Saint Petersburg, and returned to the Baltic Fleet. By 1849 he attained the rank of captain and was in command of a ship-of-the-line.

In the beginning of the Crimean War (July 1853), Voyevodsky was appointed Governor of Russian America. He reached Novoarkhangelsk on board of Sitka in April 1854; the ship soon seized by the British. Apart from this accident, the war did not hurt Russian America directly: lands of Russian America and the British Hudson's Bay Company were declared neutral and remained neutral throughout the war. Voyevodsky remained in charge of Russian America until June 1859; upon his return to Russia he was appointed commander of Astrakhan port and military governor of Astrakhan. 

Voyevodsky attained the rank of full admiral in 1877; he died in Saint Petersburg and was buried at the Smolenskoye Cemetery.

References

 

Governors of the Russian-American Company
Imperial Russian Navy admirals
1803 births
1884 deaths
Naval Cadet Corps alumni